De Arend is a name given to some windmills and a locomotive in the Netherlands.

Windmills
De Arend, Coevorden, a windmill in Drenthe.
De Arend, Leeuwarden, a former post mill in Friesland
De Arend, Leeuwarden, a former smock mill in Friesland
De Arend, Terheijden, a windmill in North Brabant
De Arend, Wouw, a windmill in North Brabant
De Arend, Zuidland, windmill in South Holland
Den Arend, Bergambacht, a windmill in South Holland

Other
De Arend (locomotive), the first locomotive in the Netherlands